In February 2009, the government of Portugal announced plans to build a high-speed rail line from Lisbon to Madrid; this plan was cancelled in March 2012 amidst a bailout programme of financial assistance to the Portuguese Republic. The project was valued at €7.8 billion and the government had claimed it would create 100,000 jobs. The line would link to Spain's Southwest Corridor.

In October 2020, the Portuguese government proposed a 75 minute rail link between the cities of Lisbon and Porto and a 55 minute rail link between Porto and Vigo (Spain). These new links will connect with the current railway system in Leiria, Coimbra, Aveiro and Braga (besides the already mentioned cities), diminishing travel times overall in the country.

Current operations

The service is operated using 10 Italian-designed Pendolino tilting trains. Based on the Italian ETR 480, trains were assembled in Portugal at the former SOREFAME/Adtranz plant in Amadora. Fiat Ferroviaria was the main contractor, with Siemens AG and ADtranz as subcontractors.

In addition to these high-speed trains, CP InterCity "corail" coaches have been upgraded to  running. These are hauled by CP 5600 locomotives (identical to the Spanish RENFE Class 252). These "corail" coaches are based on French SNCF Corail cars but their carbody is made out of stainless steel, manufactured at the SOREFAME plant.

Current infrastructure
The Northern Line was modernised to allow trains to run at 220 km/h between Lisbon-Alverca, Vila Franca de Xira–Santarém, Pombal–Alfarelos and Mealhada–Espinho, and to allow full use of the tilting to achieve speeds between 140–180 km/h in the remaining intermediate sections. Work is underway to continue to bring these intermediate stretches up to standards.

The Southern Line was modernised to allow trains to run at 220 km/h between Lisbon-Pinhal Novo and Grândola–Funcheira; work is underway in a new variant between Pinhal Novo-Grandola to allow seamless 220 km/h running all the way from Lisboa to Funcheira (150 km). 
Alfa Pendular trains with their top speed of 220 km/h are in fact the only reason the top speed is 220 km/h. The tilting trains run in most slower sections at 20/40 km/h above conventional trains speeds. On high speed sections conventional trains run at 200 km/h and Tilting trains at their 220 km/h top speed. The true speed limit on these long sections is well above 220 km/h.

In February 2011, trains began using the Alcácer Bypass, cutting 6.7 km of the Southern Line through means of a 29 km line that includes a bridge across the Sado River. Trains will be able to travel at 200 km along the section, or 220 km with tilting technology. The new bypass will cut 10m from the journey times of trains traveling south from Lisbon towards the Algarve.

Trains run hourly between Lisbon and Porto, most being Alfa Pendular (3 stops at Coimbra, Aveiro and Vila Nova de Gaia); other Alfa Pendular and some InterCity (which loco hauled 200 km/h trains with 5/14 cars) call at 6 to 9 intermediate stops.
Additionally some Alfa Pendular and Intercity trains run north to Guimarães and Braga and others go down the south line to service Faro, which is served by two Porto - Lisboa - Faro Alfa Pendulars and three Lisbon - Faro InterCity (limited to 160 km/h due to the refurbished Sorefame coaches used on the route).

Previous plans for high-speed rail
In 2005 the Portuguese government had approved the construction of three high-speed lines:
 from the capital Lisbon to Porto (300 km/h new HSL expected to be finished in 2015). The two biggest cities of Portugal would be at a distance of a 1h15 train trip.

On December 12, 2009, the Portuguese Ministry of Public Work, Transport and Communications announced the ELOS consortium was awarded a 40-year contract to build, finance and maintain the first 165 km section of the high speed line from Poceirão to the Spanish border, Caia. The route's length is 165 km. The PPP contract was formally signed on 8 May 2010 and included construction of a broad-gauge freight track between Evora and Caia. Completion was expected by the end of 2013.

However, with the Great Recession, and the resulting European sovereign-debt crisis, major public works projects in Portugal were frozen to reduce the amount of public debt. In this context the later elected (2011) Portuguese government withdrew the high-speed railway plans in favour of a plan to develop standard-gauge freight routes to the rest of Europe. After a high profile court battle with the ELOS consortium the high speed rail project was terminated by the Portuguese government.

Lines planned

Lisbon–Porto 

In October 2022 the Portuguese government announced that construction on a new high speed line from Lisbon to Porto would start in 2024. The new line will be built to double track and Iberian gauge. It would allow speeds of up to 300 km/h. This would reduce the current travel time between Lisbon and Porto from the current 2 hours and 49 minutes to 1 hour and 15 minutes. The cost of the project is expected to be € 4.9 billion by 2030, of which € 1 billion is contributed by the European Union.

The line will be constructed in three phases. The first phase between Porto and Soure is to be completed by 2028 and will reduce travel time by 50 minutes. The second phase between Soure and Carregado is to be completed by 2030, further reducing travel time by 40 minutes. The last phase between Carregado and Lisbon will be completed at a later date after 2030 and bring a smaller travel time reduction of 4 minutes.

The capacity of the Lisbon Oriente and Porto Campanhã stations will be increased for this line. Trains on the line will also serve upgraded intermediate stations in Leiria, Coimbra and Aveiro, as well as a new station in Vila Nova de Gaia.

Porto–Vigo 

There are plans to extend the Lisbon–Porto high-speed rail line to Vigo in Spain, where it will connect with the Spanish AVE high speed rail network. There is no target date at this time, however.

Lisbon–Madrid 
The Madrid–Extremadura high-speed rail line in Spain will eventually be extended to Lisbon, but there is no target date yet.

See also 
 Comboios de Portugal: The state passenger rail service in Portugal

References

External links
 Alfa Pendular at CP (Train Operator Company) official page
 REFER (Rail Infrastructure company)
 RAVE - Rede de Alta Velocidade (High Speed Infr. Company, now a part of REFER)

 
Rail transport in Portugal